The 1973 Denver Broncos season was the team's 14th year in professional football and its fourth with the National Football League (NFL). Led by second-year head coach and general manager John Ralston, the Broncos posted a winning record for the first time in franchise history, with seven wins, five losses, and two ties, which tied for sixth-best in the conference. Denver tied for second in the AFC West (third with tiebreaker), 1½ games behind the Oakland Raiders.

One of the ties, in their first-ever game with the Cardinals, was the nearest they came to losing to that franchise until 2010, and also their only NFL appearance in St. Louis until 2000 against the relocated Rams at Edward Jones Dome.

Offseason

NFL draft

Personnel

Staff

Roster

Regular season

Schedule

Standings

Season summary

Week 10 at Steelers

Awards and honors
 UPI AFC Coach of the Year: John Ralston

References

External links
Denver Broncos – 1973 media guide
1973 Denver Broncos at Pro-Football-Reference.com

Denver Broncos
Denver Broncos seasons
1973 in sports in Colorado